Hypercompe andromela is a moth of the family Erebidae first described by Harrison Gray Dyar Jr. in 1909. It is found in Mexico.

References

andromela
Moths described in 1909